The World seen from the train (Le monde vu du train) is a French adventure travel television series presented and directed by Olivier Weber, an award-winning writer, novelist and reporter, known primarily for his coverage of the wars in Iraq and Afghanistan. The documentaries were inspired by the author's books and reports around the world.

Concept
Olivier Weber takes his camera on a tour of railway carriages and compartments throughout the world.

In several European Asian and Far East countries, the films take a new approach to the railway travel writing and filming genre by attempting to get to know people. Slices of life, scenery and stopovers are the main ingredients of the programmes.

Episodes
 North India 
 South India 
 Turkey 
 Switzerland 
 South Africa 01
 South Africa 02
 North Thailand 
 SouthThailand 
 Scotland 
 Spain 
 Morocco 
 Portugal
 Alps 
 Pyrenees 
 Ireland
 Austria
 Madagascar
 Norway
 Croatia
 Quebec
 Tunisia
 Sicily
 Czech Republic
 Mauritania
 United States
 Mexico

References

External links
 Voyage Channel's Official website
 In english
 A travel writer in Amazonia

In development : Austria - Madagascar

French documentary films
French documentary television series
Documentary films about nature
2010s French television series